Feixia Middle School is a public middle school in Jinping District, Shantou city, Guangdong province, China found in 1982. It's a highest school of province level, and the acknowledged best secondary school in Shantou. Many of there graduate students go to Jingshan High School, but few of them will get chance to study in Temasek Secondary School in Singapore.

Organization 
Creative Engennering 
Feiyang Literature Salon

Shantou
Schools in Guangdong